The Andorra national under-17 football team represents Andorra in international football at this age level and is controlled by Federació Andorrana de Futbol, the governing body for football in Andorra.

UEFA U-16/17 European Championship record

Current squad
The following players were called for the matches against Austria, Poland and Montenegro on 20, 23 and 26 October 2022.

Caps and goals correct as of 26 October 2022, after the match against Montenegro.

See also
 Andorra national football team

 

Andorra national football team
European national under-17 association football teams